Hérica Tibúrcio (born January 1, 1993) is a Brazilian mixed martial artist who competes in the Atomweight division and she is a former Invicta FC Atomweight Champion. Also she is the youngest champion in the history of the organization at the age of 21 after winning the title in her very first fight in the promotion, outside of her native Brazil and at Atomweight.

Tibúrcio's first title defense took place at Invicta FC 13: Cyborg vs. Van Duin on July 10, 2015 against Ayaka Hamasaki. Tibúrcio lost the fight via split decision.

Championships and accomplishments

Mixed martial arts
Invicta Fighting Championships
Invicta FC Atomweight Champion (One time)
Youngest champion in Invicta FC history (21)
Performance of the Night (Two times) vs. Michelle Waterson and Simona Soukupova
Fight of the Night (One time) vs. Michelle Waterson
Women's MMA Awards
2014 Fight of the Year vs. Michelle Waterson on December 5
FightBooth.com
2014 Upset of the Year vs. Michelle Waterson on December 5

Mixed martial arts record

|-
|Loss
| style="text-align:center;"|11–5
|Jéssica Delboni
|Decision (unanimous)
|Invicta FC 42: Cummins vs. Zappitella
|
| style="text-align:center;"| 3
| style="text-align:center;"| 5:00
|Kansas City, Kansas, United States
|
|-
|Win
| style="text-align:center;"|11–4
|Tessa Simpson
|Decision (split)
|Invicta FC 23: Porto vs. Niedźwiedź
|
| style="text-align:center;"| 3
| style="text-align:center;"| 5:00
|Kansas City, Missouri, United States
|
|-
|Win
| style="text-align:center;"|10–4
|Simona Soukupova
|Decision (unanimous)
|Invicta FC 20: Evinger vs. Kunitskaya
|
| style="text-align:center;"| 3
| style="text-align:center;"| 5:00
|Kansas City, Missouri, United States
|Performance of the Night.
|-
|Loss
| style="text-align:center;"|9–4
|Jinh Yu Frey
|Decision (unanimous)
|Invicta FC 16: Hamasaki vs. Brown
|
| style="text-align:center;"| 3
| style="text-align:center;"| 5:00
|Las Vegas, Nevada, United States
|
|-
|Loss
| style="text-align:center;"|9–3
|Ayaka Hamasaki
|Decision (split)
|Invicta FC 13: Cyborg vs. Van Duin
|
| style="text-align:center;"| 5
| style="text-align:center;"| 5:00
|Las Vegas, Nevada, United States
|Lost the Invicta FC Atomweight Championship
|-
|Win
| style="text-align:center;"|9–2
|Michelle Waterson
|Submission (guillotine choke)
|Invicta FC 10: Waterson vs. Tiburcio
|
| style="text-align:center;"| 3
| style="text-align:center;"| 1:04
|Houston, Texas, United States
|Invicta FC debut. Atomweight debut. Won the Invicta FC Atomweight Championship. Fight of the Night. Performance of the night. WMMA Fight of the Year.
|-
|Win
| style="text-align:center;"|8–2
|Aline Sattelmeyer
|Decision (unanimous)
|MMA Super Heroes 3
|
| style="text-align:center;"| 3
| style="text-align:center;"| 5:00
|Sao Paulo, Brazil
|
|-
|Win
| style="text-align:center;"|7–2
|Chayen Aline Gaspar
|Submission (armbar)
|Talent MMA Circuit 5: Campinas 2013
|
| style="text-align:center;"| 1
| style="text-align:center;"| 1:57
|Sao Paulo, Brazil
|
|-
|Win
| style="text-align:center;"|6–2
|Kinberly Tanaka Novaes
|Submission (armbar)
|MMA Super Heroes 1
|
| style="text-align:center;"| 3
| style="text-align:center;"| 3:54
|Sao Paulo, Brazil
|
|-
|Loss
| style="text-align:center;"|5–2
|Cláudia Gadelha
|Decision (unanimous)
|Max Sport 13.2
|
| style="text-align:center;"| 3
| style="text-align:center;"| 5:00
|Sao Paulo, Brazil
|
|-
|Loss
| style="text-align:center;"|5–1
|Camila Lima
|Decision (split)
|Supreme Fight Championship
|
| style="text-align:center;"| 3
| style="text-align:center;"| 5:00
|Sao Paulo, Brazil
|
|-
|Win
| style="text-align:center;"|5–0
|Cyrlania Onelina Souza
|Submission (armbar)
|Pink Fight 2
|
| style="text-align:center;"| 1
| style="text-align:center;"| 3:30
|Rio de Janeiro, Brazil
|
|-
|Win
| style="text-align:center;"|4–0
|Alessandra Silva
|Decision (unanimous)
|Pink Fight
|
| style="text-align:center;"| 3
| style="text-align:center;"| 5:00
|Bahia, Brazil
|
|-
|Win
| style="text-align:center;"|3–0
|Bruna Paiffer
|Submission (guillotine choke)
|Full Heroes Battle 4
|
| style="text-align:center;"| 1
| style="text-align:center;"| 3:10
|Paranaguá, Brazil
|
|-
|Win
| style="text-align:center;"|2–0
|Camila Lima
|Submission (guillotine choke)
|Centurion Fight Combat
|
| style="text-align:center;"| 1
| style="text-align:center;"| 2:30
|Sao Paulo, Brazil
|
|-
|Win
| style="text-align:center;"|1–0
|Daniela Souza
|Submission (armbar)
|FPMMA Combat
|
| style="text-align:center;"| 1
| style="text-align:center;"| 0:56
|Sao Paulo, Brazil
|
|}

See also
 List of female mixed martial artists

References

External links
 
 Herica Tiburcio at Invicta FC

1993 births
Sportspeople from São Paulo (state)
Living people
Brazilian practitioners of Brazilian jiu-jitsu
Female Brazilian jiu-jitsu practitioners
Atomweight mixed martial artists
Strawweight mixed martial artists
Mixed martial artists utilizing Brazilian jiu-jitsu
Brazilian female mixed martial artists